The Democratic Party (also known for a time as the Democratic Alliance Party) is a political party in the Cook Islands. As a result of the 2022 Cook Islands election, it is currently in opposition, holding five seats in the Cook Islands Parliament.

Early years

The Democratic Party was founded by Tom Davis in 1971, in opposition to the Cook Islands Party (CIP) of Albert Henry.  In the 1972 election, it won eight seats, breaking the two-thirds majority of the CIP.  In 1978, it won power, with Davis becoming Prime Minister. It became one of the two primary parties of the Cook Islands, alternating in power with the CIP. Davis served as prime minister of the Cook Islands from 1978 to 1987, with a brief interruption in 1983 when the Cook Islands briefly returned to power. The Democratic Party remained in power until 1989. In the late 1990s, the party experienced a split, with the majority of the party renamed as the Democratic Alliance Party. A breakaway faction led by Norman George was named the New Alliance Party. Despite this, the Democratic Party became the largest political party in the 1999 elections, winning 11 of 25 seats. The New Alliance Party, with 4 seats, made a coalition with the Cook Islands party to keep that party in power for several more months, but the coalition soon broke down, and the New Alliance Party formed a coalition party with the Democrats, allowing Democratic party leader Terepai Maoate to become prime minister. The Democratic Alliance Party and the New Alliance Party later reunited under the old Democratic Party name.

In 2002 Maoate was overthrown in a no confidence vote and replaced by his deputy Robert Woonton, also a member of the DAP. It formed a coalition with the Cook Islands Party which broke down in 2003.

2004 and 2006 elections

At the next elections, 7 September 2004, the Democratic Alliance won 47.2% of popular votes and 12 out of 24 seats. Prime Minister Robert Woonton, though initially believed to have retained his seat, which would have allowed the Democratic Party to have a majority, was determined in a recount to have received an equal number of votes as his opponent, and he lost a revote. The new party leader, Jim Marurai, became Prime Minister. In 2005, however, Marurai left the party due to internal disputes, founding his own Cook Islands First Party. Marurai continued to govern with the help of the CIP. Later, however, the agreement with the CIP broke down, and Marurai allied himself with the Democrats again. He has since rejoined the party, continuing to serve as Prime Minister but not party leader. Terepai Maoate became deputy prime minister and party leader. At the 2006 elections, the Democratic Party gained a majority of seats, winning 15 of the 24 seats.

2010 election campaign

The party suffered from internal strife in the leadup to the 2010 election.  In December 2009, Prime Minister Jim Marurai sacked his Deputy Prime Minister, Terepai Maoate, sparking a mass-resignation of Democratic Party cabinet members He and new Deputy Prime Minister Robert Wigmore were subsequently expelled from the Democratic Party, and the party withdrew its support.  A formal split was averted in June 2010 when a party conference readmitted Marurai, Wigmore, and the other Cabinet members, and appointed Wigmore as party leader, with Wilkie Rasmussen as his deputy.  However, several senior MPs, including former leader Terepai Maoate and former President John Tangi subsequently failed to win reselection and ran as independents.

The party launched its campaign on 7 October in vaka Takitumu with the campaign slogan "Our Future. Now."  The party promised stability, benefit increases, and public service cuts. It contested every electorate except Arutanga-Nikaupara-Reureu.  The party was unsuccessful in the elections, winning only 8 of 24 seats.

After the death of Robert Wigmore from cancer in April 2012 Wilkie Rasmussen was appointed acting leader.  His leadership of the party was confirmed at the party's annual conference in August 2012.

Electoral performance

Legislative Assembly

Leaders
 Tom Davis (1971–1987)
 Pupuke Robati (1987–1991)
 Terepai Maoate (1991 – 21 November 2003)
 Robert Woonton (21 November 2003 – 10 May 2004)
 Terepai Maoate (10 May 2004 – 3 June 2010)
 Robert Wigmore (3 June 2010 – 13 April 2012)
 Wilkie Rasmussen (14 April 2012 – 9 April 2015)
 William (Smiley) Heather (16 April 2015 – 13 April 2017)
 Tina Browne (13 April 2017 – present)

Party presidents
 Makiuti Tongia (until 3 June 2010)
 Sean Willis (3 June 2010 – present)

References

Political parties in the Cook Islands
Liberal parties in Oceania
Political parties established in 1971
Main